The 2010 Saskatchewan Scotties Tournament of Hearts is the 2010 edition of the Saskatchewan provincial women's curling championship. It was held January 6-10. Play began at the Kindersley Curling Club in Kindersley, Saskatchewan.  However, due to a fire at the Kindersley Complex on January 8, the Scotties tournament play had been suspended January 8th until January 9th. The remainder of the games were held at the Eston Curling Club in Eston, Saskatchewan. The winning team represented Saskatchewan at the 2010 Scotties Tournament of Hearts in Sault Ste. Marie, Ontario.

Teams

Standings

Pool A

Holland 10-1 Inglis
Eberle 7-3 Campbell
Inglis 9-8 Ricci 
Silvernagle 8-6 Eberle (11)
Ricci 10-3 Campbell 
Holland 9-1 Silvernagle 
Campbell 7-6 Inglis
Holland 6-4 Eberle
Holland 6-5 Ricci
Campbell 8-6 Silvernagle 
Eberle 8-3 Ricci
Inglis 7-5 Silvernagle
Holland 11-0 Campbell
Eberle 12-6 Inglis
Silvernagle 10-1 Ricci

Pool B
 

Lawton 8-7 Streifel (11)
Englot 6-5 Anderson 
Englot 10-2 Lang
Hersikorn 8-5 Streifel 
Anderson 9-3 Hersikorn 
Lawton 9-1 Lang
Anderson 9-4 Streifel
Lawton 6-5 Englot
Lawton 5-3 Hersikorn
Anderson 9-5 Lang
Hersikorn 9-7 Englot
Lang 7-5 Streifel
Englot 12-6 Streifel
Anderson 6-3 Lawton
Hersikorn 9-7 Lang

Playoffs

A1 vs. B1
January 10, 9:00 AM

A2 vs. B2
January 10, 9:00 AM

Semifinal
January 10, 2:00 PM

Final
January 10, 7:00 PM

References

Saskatchewan
Scotties Tournament of Hearts
Saskatchewan Scotties Tournament of Hearts
Curling in Saskatchewan